In geometry of 4 dimensions or higher, a double prism or duoprism is a polytope resulting from the Cartesian product of two polytopes, each of two dimensions or higher.

The lowest-dimensional duoprisms exist in 4-dimensional space as 4-polytopes being the Cartesian product of two polygons in 2-dimensional Euclidean space. More precisely, it is the set of points:

Such a duoprism is convex if both bases are convex, and is bounded by prismatic cells.

Nomenclature

Four-dimensional duoprisms are considered to be prismatic 4-polytopes. A duoprism constructed from two regular polygons of the same edge length is a uniform duoprism.

A duoprism made of n-polygons and m-polygons is named by prefixing 'duoprism' with the names of the base polygons, for example: a triangular-pentagonal duoprism is the Cartesian product of a triangle and a pentagon.

An alternative, more concise way of specifying a particular duoprism is by prefixing with numbers denoting the base polygons, for example: 3,5-duoprism for the triangular-pentagonal duoprism.

Other alternative names:
 q-gonal-p-gonal prism 
 q-gonal-p-gonal double prism 
 q-gonal-p-gonal hyperprism

The term duoprism is coined by George Olshevsky, shortened from double prism. John Horton Conway proposed a similar name proprism for product prism, a Cartesian product of two or more polytopes of dimension at least two. The duoprisms are proprisms formed from exactly two polytopes.

Example 16-16 duoprism

Geometry of 4-dimensional duoprisms
A 4-dimensional uniform duoprism is created by the product of a regular n-sided polygon and a regular m-sided polygon with the same edge length. It is bounded by n m-gonal prisms and m n-gonal prisms. For example, the Cartesian product of a triangle and a hexagon is a duoprism bounded by 6 triangular prisms and 3 hexagonal prisms.

When m and n are identical, the resulting duoprism is bounded by 2n identical n-gonal prisms. For example, the Cartesian product of two triangles is a duoprism bounded by 6 triangular prisms.
When m and n are identically 4, the resulting duoprism is bounded by 8 square prisms (cubes), and is identical to the tesseract.

The m-gonal prisms are attached to each other via their m-gonal faces, and form a closed loop. Similarly, the n-gonal prisms are attached to each other via their n-gonal faces, and form a second loop perpendicular to the first. These two loops are attached to each other via their square faces, and are mutually perpendicular.

As m and n approach infinity, the corresponding duoprisms approach the duocylinder. As such, duoprisms are useful as non-quadric approximations of the duocylinder.

Nets

Perspective projections

A cell-centered perspective projection makes a duoprism look like a torus, with two sets of orthogonal cells, p-gonal and q-gonal prisms.

The p-q duoprisms are identical to the q-p duoprisms, but look different in these projections because they are projected in the center of different cells.

Orthogonal projections
Vertex-centered orthogonal projections of p-p duoprisms project into [2n] symmetry for odd degrees, and [n] for even degrees. There are n vertices projected into the center. For 4,4, it represents the A3 Coxeter plane of the tesseract. The 5,5 projection is identical to the 3D rhombic triacontahedron.

Related polytopes 

The regular skew polyhedron, {4,4|n}, exists in 4-space as the n2 square faces of a n-n duoprism, using all 2n2 edges and n2 vertices. The 2n n-gonal faces can be seen as removed. (skew polyhedra can be seen in the same way by a n-m duoprism, but these are not regular.)

Duoantiprism 

Like the antiprisms as alternated prisms, there is a set of 4-dimensional duoantiprisms: 4-polytopes that can be created by an alternation operation applied to a duoprism. The alternated vertices create nonregular tetrahedral cells, except for the special case, the 4-4 duoprism (tesseract) which creates the uniform (and regular) 16-cell. The 16-cell is the only convex uniform duoantiprism.

The duoprisms , t0,1,2,3{p,2,q}, can be alternated into , ht0,1,2,3{p,2,q}, the "duoantiprisms", which cannot be made uniform in general. The only convex uniform solution is the trivial case of p=q=2, which is a lower symmetry construction of the tesseract , t0,1,2,3{2,2,2}, with its alternation as the 16-cell, s{2}s{2}.

The only nonconvex uniform solution is p=5, q=5/3, ht0,1,2,3{5,2,5/3}, constructed from 10 pentagonal antiprisms, 10 pentagrammic crossed-antiprisms, and 50 tetrahedra, known as the great duoantiprism (gudap).

Ditetragoltriates 
Also related are the ditetragoltriates or octagoltriates, formed by taking the octagon (considered to be a ditetragon or a truncated square) to a p-gon. The octagon of a p-gon can be clearly defined if one assumes that the octagon is the convex hull of two perpendicular rectangles; then the p-gonal ditetragoltriate is the convex hull of two p-p duoprisms (where the p-gons are similar but not congruent, having different sizes) in perpendicular orientations. The resulting polychoron is isogonal and has 2p p-gonal prisms and p2 rectangular trapezoprisms (a cube with D2d symmetry) but cannot be made uniform. The vertex figure is a triangular bipyramid.

Double antiprismoids 
Like the duoantiprisms as alternated duoprisms, there is a set of p-gonal double antiprismoids created by alternating the 2p-gonal ditetragoltriates, creating p-gonal antiprisms and tetrahedra while reinterpreting the non-corealmic triangular bipyramidal spaces as two tetrahedra. The resulting figure is generally not uniform except for two cases: the grand antiprism and its conjugate, the pentagrammic double antiprismoid (with p = 5 and 5/3 respectively), represented as the alternation of a decagonal or decagrammic ditetragoltriate. The vertex figure is a variant of the sphenocorona.

k_22 polytopes 

The 3-3 duoprism, -122, is first in a dimensional series of uniform polytopes, expressed by Coxeter as k22 series. The 3-3 duoprism is the vertex figure for the second, the birectified 5-simplex. The fourth figure is a Euclidean honeycomb, 222, and the final is a paracompact hyperbolic honeycomb, 322, with Coxeter group [32,2,3], . Each progressive uniform polytope is constructed from the previous as its vertex figure.

See also

Polytope and 4-polytope
Convex regular 4-polytope
Duocylinder
Tesseract

Notes

References
Regular Polytopes, H. S. M. Coxeter, Dover Publications, Inc., 1973, New York, p. 124.
 Coxeter, The Beauty of Geometry: Twelve Essays, Dover Publications, 1999,    (Chapter 5: Regular Skew Polyhedra in three and four dimensions and their topological analogues)
 Coxeter, H. S. M. Regular Skew Polyhedra in Three and Four Dimensions. Proc. London Math. Soc. 43, 33-62, 1937.
 John H. Conway, Heidi Burgiel, Chaim Goodman-Strass, The Symmetries of Things 2008,  (Chapter 26)
 N.W. Johnson: The Theory of Uniform Polytopes and Honeycombs, Ph.D. Dissertation, University of Toronto, 1966

4-polytopes